Druzia is a monotypic genus of Brazilian jumping spiders containing the single species, Druzia flavostriata. It was first described by G. R. S. Ruiz & Antônio Domingos Brescovit in 2013, and is only found in Brazil.

References

Monotypic Salticidae genera
Salticidae
Spiders of Brazil